Gutenberg an der Raabklamm is a former municipality in the district of Weiz in the Austrian state of Styria. Since the 2015 Styria municipal structural reform, it is part of the municipality Gutenberg-Stenzengreith.

References

Cities and towns in Weiz District